Adirem Tejeda (born 21 June 2002) is a Mexican rhythmic gymnast, and a member of the national senior group.

Career 
Tejeda debuted at the 2021 World Cup in Sofia, finishing 7th in the All-Around, 4th with 5 balls and 5th with 3 hoops and 4 clubs. In Tashkent they reached 4th place in the All-Around, 6th with 5 balls and 4th with 3 hoops and 4 clubs. In May she travelled to Pesaro with the group ending 8th in the All-Around, 9th with 5 balls and 3 hoops and 4 clubs. A week later she competed at the 2021 Pan American Gymnastics Championships in Rio de Janeiro along Andrea Garza, Adriana Hernández, Sara Ruíz, Karen Villanueva winning silver behind Brazil in the All-Around and both event finals.

In 2022, Adirem and the group participated at the World Cup in Portimão, being 4th in the All-Around and winning two historical medals, the first in the circuit for the country: bronze with 5 hoops and gold with 3 ribbons and 2 balls. A week later, in Pesaro, they took 7th place in the All-Around and 5th in both event finals. In July she competed at the Pan American Championships in Rio de Janeiro, winning silver in the All-Around and with 5 hoops and gold with 3 ribbons and 2 balls. A month later she was in Cluj-Napoca with the group for the last World Cup of the year, ending 4th in the All-Around and with 5 hoops as well as 6th with 3 ribbons and 2 balls. In September Adirem represented Mexico along Dalia Alcocer, Nicole Cejudo, Sofia Flores and Kimberly Salazar at the World Championships in Sofia, taking 6th place in the All-Around, 6th with 5 hoops and 8th with 3 ribbons and 2 balls.

Achievements 

 Part of the first group that was awarded a medal in the World Cup circuit when she won bronze in Portimão in 2022.
 Part of the first group that was awarded a gold medal in the World Cup circuit in Portimão in 2022.

References 

2002 births
Living people
Mexican rhythmic gymnasts
Sportspeople from Yucatán (state)